Sancé may refer to:

 Sancé, Bam, Burkina Faso, a town
 Sancé, Bazèga, Burkina Faso, a town
 Sancé, Saône-et-Loire, France, a commune
 Šance, Vrbovce, Slovakia, a village